Frank Stevens may refer to:

Frank Douglas Stevens, flying ace
Frank Stevens, character in Revenge (TV series)

See also
Frankie Stevens, New Zealand entertainer and singer
Franklin Stevens (disambiguation)
Frank Stephens (disambiguation)
Francis Stevens (disambiguation)